Gordon Warnecke (born 24 August 1962 in London) is a British actor of Indo-Guyanese and German descent. He is known for his role as Omar in the 1985 film My Beautiful Laundrette, co-starring as the lover of Johnny (Daniel Day-Lewis). Other film credits include Franco Zeffirelli's Young Toscanini and Hanif Kureishi's London Kills Me.

Television credits include Boon, Doctor Who (in the serial Mindwarp), Only Fools and Horses, Virtual Murder, Birds of a Feather, EastEnders, Holby City and The Bill.

An experienced theatre actor, he has performed with the Royal Shakespeare Company and the Royal Court Theatre; he most recently returned to the stage with a national tour of Ibsen's An Enemy of the People for Tara Arts and two new contemporary adaptations of Christmas productions at the Trinity Theatre in Tunbridge Wells, Kent. He has written and directed a short film The Magician which was to be released in March 2012. He was also in an episode of Holby City in March 2017.

Since 2014, he has been actor-in-residence at East Barnet School in North London, providing workshops and masterclasses to pupils.

Film

References

External links
 

English male film actors
English male television actors
Living people
1962 births
English people of German descent
English people of Indo-Guyanese descent
British male actors of Indian descent
Male actors from London